A Thin Shell is the third album by death/doom metal band October Tide. This was the first album the band released in 11 years. This is the only October Tide release with vocalist Tobias Netzell.

Track listing

Personnel
October Tide
Tobias Netzell – vocals
Fredrik Norrman – guitar
Robin Bergh – drums

Additional personnel
Jonas Kjellgren – session bass, mixing, production (at Black Lounge and Abyss Studios, March 2009 – March 2010)
Jeramie Kling – engineering
Plec – mastering (at Panic-Room)
Mattias Norrman – photography
Andreas Kalén – photo editing
Travis Smith – artwork, layout

References

2010 albums
October Tide albums
Candlelight Records albums
Albums with cover art by Travis Smith (artist)